is the 3rd single by Japanese rock band Field of View. It reached #3 on the Oricon chart in its first week and charted for 19 weeks and sold 898,000 copies.

Track listing
Kimi ga Ita kara
composer: Tetsurō Oda/lyricist: Izumi Sakai/arranger: Takeshi Hayama
Keiko Utoku, Izumi Sakai, Daria Kawashima and Yuuichi Ikuzawa are participating in chorus part
Zard cover this song on her album Today Is Another Day.
the song was used as theme song for Fuji TV drama Kayagaku Kisetsu no Naka de
Sepia
composer: U-ya Asaoka/lyricst: Yoshio Tatano/arranger: Jun Abe
Kimi ga Ita kara (Original Karaoke)

References 

1995 singles
Songs written by Izumi Sakai
Japanese-language songs
Rock ballads
1995 songs
Songs written by Tetsurō Oda